Bollworm is the common term for a moth larva that attacks the fruiting bodies of certain crops, especially cotton.
The most common moths known as bollworms are:

 Red or Sudan bollworm, Diparopsis castanea
 Rough bollworm, Earias perhuegeli
 Spotted bollworm, Earias fabia
 Spiny bollworm, Earias insulana
 Spotted bollworm, Earias vittella
 American cotton bollworm or tomato grub, Helicoverpa armigera
 Cotton bollworm, Helicoverpa gelotopoeon
 Cotton bollworm, Helicoverpa punctigera
 Corn earworm, Helicoverpa zea
 Tobacco budworm, Heliothis virescens
 Pink bollworm, Pectinophora gossypiella
 Pinkspotted bollworm, Pectinophora scutigera
== See also ==
Cotton bollworm
Boll weevil, the beetle Anthonomus grandis

External links
H. virescens, tobacco budworm on the UF / IFAS Featured Creatures Web site

Lepidoptera and humans
Agricultural pest insects
Former disambiguation pages converted to set index articles